Armeria berlengensis is a flowering plant, a member of a mostly Mediterranean group including  the thrifts and sea pinks. It is endemic to the Berlengas, a Portuguese archipelago, where it occurs on the rocky granitic slopes of the islands. It is common on both Berlenga Grande Island and Farilhões Islets.

It is a shrub about 40 cm in diameter, which flowers in April and May.

References

Castroviejo, S. et al., eds.  Flora iberica: plantas vasculares de la Peninsula Iberica e Islas Baleares. 1989.
Flora da Berlenga

berlengensis
Flora of Portugal
Endemic flora of Portugal